Clarence Steven McGann (born June 28, 1951) is an American diplomat who served as the United States Ambassador to Fiji, Kiribati, Nauru, Tonga, and Tuvalu from 2008 to 2011. He was nominated by President George W. Bush, and assumed his duties at post in October 2008.

Ambassador McGann served as the Senior Advisor of the Dwight D. Eisenhower School for National Security and Resource Strategy at the National Defense University (NDU) in Washington, D.C. The Eisenhower School prepares select military, civilian and international fellows for strategic leadership. He was previously the Vice Chancellor of the College of International Security Affairs (CISA) at NDU (2011–2014), focusing on building global partnerships. McGann continues as a CISA Adjunct Professor. He is a Senior Foreign Service Officer with the rank of Minister-Counselor (FE-MC).

McGann was assigned as Chargé d'Affaires (ad interim) of the United States Embassy in Dili, Timor-Leste (2014). McGann was the United States Ambassador to the Republics of Fiji, Nauru, Kiribati, and the Kingdom of Tonga and Tuvalu (2008–2011). His achievements centered on democracy-building, law enforcement cooperation, maritime security, humanitarian assistance, disaster response and the largest expansion of U.S. diplomatic presence in the Pacific with the construction of Embassy Suva as a regional hub post. Overseas assignments include Taiwan, Zaire, South Africa, Australia, and Kenya.

McGann was Director of the Office for Australian, New Zealand and Pacific Island Affairs in the Bureau for East Asian and Pacific Affairs (2006–2008). He developed a framework for strengthening relations with Australia and renewing coordination with New Zealand. McGann launched a series of negotiations that led to ship-rider agreements with eight Pacific Island Countries and the U.S. Coast Guard to prevent unlicensed commercial fishing and protect local economies. He also served as a Senior Adviser in the Bureau of East Asian and Pacific Affairs as an expert on North Korean human rights and refugee issues (2005–2006).

As Director for Asia and Near East in the Bureau of Population, Refugees, and Migration (2003–2005), he was responsible for oversight of $370 million in humanitarian assistance dispensed to international organizations and NGO partners to build home country capacity and reintegrate vulnerable populations throughout the region. McGann was South Asia Bureau Deputy Director for Pakistan, Afghanistan, and Bangladesh (2000–2002) and helped strengthen regional multilateral engagement. At the United States Mission to the United Nations (1998–2000), he negotiated the Security Council resolution to address monetary sanction efforts (UNSCR 1267). He also guided the UN Security Council resolution that endorsed Nelson Mandela as Special Envoy for Burundi and worked directly with the former South African President to determine his mandate (UNSCR 1286).

McGann has a Bachelor of Arts from Claremont McKenna College (1973). He pursued graduate studies at Cornell University (1975–1978). McGann earned a Master of Science degree from the Industrial College of the Armed Forces, NDU (2003). He is a graduate of the Naval War College's Fourth Joint Force Maritime Commander Component Course (2007). He currently serves as a member of the Board of Trustees at Claremont McKenna College. McGann was born in New York, New York in 1951.

References

External links

|-

|-

|-

|-

1951 births
Living people
Ambassadors of the United States to Fiji
Ambassadors of the United States to Kiribati
Ambassadors of the United States to Nauru
Ambassadors of the United States to Tonga
Ambassadors of the United States to Tuvalu
Claremont McKenna College alumni
Cornell University alumni
Dwight D. Eisenhower School for National Security and Resource Strategy alumni
African-American diplomats
United States Foreign Service personnel
21st-century African-American people
21st-century American diplomats
20th-century African-American people